The UK Singles Chart is one of many music charts compiled by the Official Charts Company that calculates the best-selling singles of the week in the United Kingdom. Since 2004 the chart has been based on the sales of both physical singles and digital downloads, with airplay figures excluded from the official chart. From 6 July 2014, streaming figures became incorporated into the singles chart which means that a song will count as a sale, if streamed 100 times. This list shows singles that peaked in the Top 10 of the UK Singles Chart during 2016, as well as singles which peaked in 2015 and 2017 but were in the top 10 in 2016. The entry date is when the song appeared in the top 10 for the first time (week ending, as published by the Official Charts Company, which is six days after the chart is announced).

Seventy-five singles were in the top ten in 2016, the lowest number of unique top 10 singles in a calendar year since 1952, when twenty-five singles made the countdown. Ten singles from 2015 remained in the top 10 for several weeks at the beginning of the year, while "I Would Like" by Zara Larsson" was released in 2016 but did not reach its peak until 2017. "History" by One Direction was the only song from 2015 to reach its peak in 2016. Twenty-three artists scored multiple entries in the top 10 in 2016. Anne-Marie, The Chainsmokers, Jonas Blue, Lukas Graham and Rag'n'Bone Man were among the many artists who achieved their first UK charting top 10 single in 2016.

Drake's single "One Dance" tied the second longest-running spell at number-one with "Love is All Around" by Wet Wet Wet and also the most consecutive weeks at the top spot in the digital era. In January 2016, Justin Bieber held the top 3 spots in the chart in a single week, the first time an artist had achieved this in history. This year also saw the lowest number of unique chart toppers in the 21st century with ten, and the second lowest of all-time, only beaten by 1952, when Al Martino's "Here in My Heart" was the only single to reach number-one, albeit the chart only began in November that year.
 
"Love Yourself" by Canadian singer Justin Bieber returned to number-one for the first three weeks of 2016, giving the song a total of six weeks on top of the chart. The song had vacated the top spot for one week as the Lewisham and Greenwich NHS Choir secured the 2015 Christmas number-one with "A Bridge Over You". The first new number-one single of the year was "Stitches" by his fellow countryman Shawn Mendes. Overall, ten different singles peaked at number-one in 2016 , with Justin Bieber (2) having the most singles hit that position.

Background

Multiple entries
Seventy-five singles charted in the top 10 in 2016, with sixty-four singles reaching their peak this year.

Twenty-three artists scored multiple entries in the top 10 in 2016. Justin Bieber secured the record for most top 10 hits in 2016 with five hit singles.

Digital era chart record
The song One Dance by Drake spent a total of 15 consecutive weeks at number 1 making it the longest running number-one of the digital music era, breaking the record previous held by Rihanna and Jay-Z in 2007 with Umbrella which spent a total of 10 consecutive weeks at number-one. It is tied with Bryan Adams' "Everything I Do (I Do It for You)" from 1991, taken from the Robin Hood: Prince of Thieves film soundtrack, which had held the all-time record outright for 25 years.

Justin Bieber becomes first-ever artist to occupy entire UK top three
On 8 January 2016 (14 January 2016, week ending), Canadian singer Justin Bieber made history when he became the first-ever artist to hold down the entire top three positions on the UK Singles Chart concurrently. "Love Yourself" was at number-one, followed by "Sorry" at number two and "What Do You Mean" at number three. All three songs had topped the chart in 2015.

Later in 2016, Bieber occupied the top two positions of the UK chart thanks to his appearances on Major Lazer's chart-topping single "Cold Water" and DJ Snake's number two hit "Let Me Love You".

Low turnover of number-ones
Only ten different singles peaked at number-one this year, marking 2016 as the year with the least different chart toppers since 1952, when just "Here in My Heart" by Al Martino reached the summit. However the chart only began in November 1952, making this the full year with the lowest turnover of number-one singles. In 1954, just eleven singles reached number-one, with 2007's total of seventeen the previous lowest this century until 2017, when fourteen different singles climbed to the coveted position. Additionally, just seventy-five singles placed in the top 10 during the year, the lowest number since 1952.

Chart debuts
Thirty-eight artists achieved their first top 10 single in 2016, either as a lead or featured artist. Of these, two went on to record another hit single that year: The Chainsmokers and Jonas Blue.

The following table (collapsed on desktop site) does not include acts who had previously charted as part of a group and secured their first top 10 solo single. 

Notes
Zayn, Niall Horan and Louis Tomlinson all launched solo careers in 2016 and had their first top 10 charting singles outside One Direction. Zayn's "Pillowtalk" went straight to number-one, Horan's "This Town" reached number nine, while Tomlinson's collaboration with Steve Aoki, "Just Hold On", peaked at number two.

Songs from films
Original songs from various films entered the top 10 throughout the year. These included "Can't Stop the Feeling" (from Trolls), "Purple Rain" (Purple Rain, a re-entry following Prince's death) and "Heathens" (Suicide Squad).

Best-selling singles
Drake, Wizkid & Kyla  had the best-selling single of the year with One Dance. The song spent 23 weeks in the top 10 (including 15 weeks consecutively at number 1), sold around 1.95 million copies (including streams) and was certified 3× platinum by the BPI. "7 Years" by Lukas Graham came in second place, selling more than 1.49 million and losing out by around 460,000 sales. Sia's "Cheap Thrills", "I Took a Pill in Ibiza from Mike Posner and "This Is What You Came For" by Calvin Harris featuring Rihanna made up the top five. Singles by Zara Larsson, The Chainsmokers featuring Halsey, Justin Bieber, Rihanna featuring Drake, and Justin Timberlake were also in the top ten best-selling singles of the year.

Top-ten singles
Key

Entries by artist

The following table shows artists who achieved two or more top 10 entries in 2016, including singles that reached their peak in 2015 or 2017. The figures include both main artists and featured artists, while appearances on ensemble charity records are also counted for each artist. The total number of weeks an artist spent in the top ten in 2016 is also shown.

See also
2016 in British music
List of number-one singles from the 2010s (UK)

Notes 

 "Never Forget You" re-entered the top 10 at number 10 on 7 January 2016 (week ending).
 "Sax" re-entered the top 10 at number 6 on 7 January 2016 (week ending).
 "Light It Up" re-entered the top 10 at number 10 on 17 March 2016 (week ending).
 "Stitches" re-entered the top 10 at number 8 on 24 March 2016 (week ending).
 "Pillowtalk" re-entered the top 10 at number 10 on 31 March 2016 (week ending).
 "Light It Up" re-entered the top 10 at number 10 on 14 April 2016 (week ending).
 "Purple Rain" entered the top 10 at number 6 on 5 May 2016 (week ending) following the death of Prince, having originally peaked at number 8 upon release in 1984.
 "In the Name of Love" re-entered the top 10 at number 10 on 29 September 2016 (week ending).
 "24K Magic" re-entered the top 10 at number 6 on 10 November 2016 (week ending).
 "All I Want For Christmas Is You" re-entered the top 10 on 15 December 2016 (week ending) due to the song's reoccurring spike in popularity around the Christmas holiday season, having originally peaked at number 2 upon release in 1994.
 "24K Magic" re-entered the top 10 at number 10 on 5 January 2017 (week ending).
 "Shout Out to My Ex" re-entered the top 10 at number 6 on 5 January 2017 (week ending).
 "Just Hold On" re-entered the top 10 at number 10 on 12 January 2017 (week ending).
 "Sexual" re-entered the top 10 at number 6 on 12 January 2017 (week ending).
 Figure includes song that peaked in 2015.
 Figure includes song that peaked in 2017.
 Figure includes solo work and recordings with the group One Direction.
 Figure includes appearances on The Weeknd's "I Feel It Coming" and "Starboy".
 Figure includes appearances on Sia's "The Greatest" and Maroon 5's "Don't Wanna Know".
 Figure includes appearances on DJ Snake's "Let Me Love You" and Major Lazer's "Cold Water".
 Figure includes appearance on Rihanna's "Work".
 Figure includes appearance on Tinie Tempah's "Girls Like".
 Figure includes appearances on Drake's "Too Good" and Calvin Harris' "This Is What You Came For".
 Figure includes appearances on Sia's "Cheap Thrills" and Clean Bandit's "Rockabye".
 Figure includes song that first charted in 2015 but peaked in 2016.

References
General

Specific

External links
2016 singles chart archive at the Official Charts Company (click on relevant week)

United Kingdom
Top 10 singles
2016